The 1895 Northwestern Purple team represented Northwestern University during the 1895 college football season. In their first year under head coach Jesse Van Doozer, the Purple compiled a 6–5 record.

Schedule

References

Northwestern
Northwestern Wildcats football seasons
Northwestern Purple football